Tralee Parnells are a hurling club from the town of Tralee in County Kerry, Ireland.

Original club

The original Parnells won 2 Kerry Senior Hurling Championships in 1918 and 1919. All Ireland winning football captain and one of Kerry's greatest players John Joe Sheehy played with the club. The club appeared in their first final in 1911 when they lost to fellow Tralee side Tralee Mitchels 5–03 to 1-02. They won their first title in 1918 overcoming Kilgarvan 1–10 to 4-00, they were to face the same opposition in 1919 but received a walkover. They made the semi-final in 1920 and were to play Kenmare but the championship was abandoned. The championship was abandoned for much of the 1920s and by the time it resumed Tralee had three new clubs in the shape of Rock Street, Strand Road and Boherbee. Parnells last played in the 1924 championship when they beat Ballyduff in the only game played 6–03 to 1-02.

Modern club

The original club disbanded in the 1920s but in 2012 the club was reformed to promote underage hurling in Tralee. For the first number of years the club had teams up to Under 16 level. The club joined with other North Kerry clubs at minor level such as Ballyheigue and Abbeydorney, in 2017 along with Abbeydorney they made it to the Kerry MHC final but lost out to Crotta O'Neill's. In 2018 the club fielded their first stand alone minor team and had a famous win over Crotta O'Neill's. 

In 2019 100 years on from winning the 1919 county SHC the club returned to adult hurling with the announcement of an Under 21 and Intermediate team with plans to field an adult Camogie team.

In the clubs first season they qualified for the Kerry Intermediate Hurling Championship semi-final where they lot to Kilgarvan.

In 2020 the club went a step more and qualified for the final, but lost out to Dr. Crokes.

In 2021 the club represented Kerry in the Munster Junior Club Hurling Championship. They suffered a heavy loss to Tipperary champions Skeheenarinky.

2022 was another notable year for the underage section of the club. They won the Kerry Féile na nGael Div 1 title, before later adding the Féile na nGael Div 3 title.

The club has a growing membership, with well over 240 boys and girls as of 2018.

Achievements
 Kerry Senior Hurling Championship Winners (2) 1918, 1919
 North Kerry Under 21 Hurling Championship Winners (1) 2021
 Kerry Féile na nGael Div 1 winners (1) 2022
 Féile na nGael Div 3 winners (1) 2022

References

Former Gaelic Athletic Association clubs in Kerry
Gaelic games clubs in County Kerry
Hurling clubs in County Kerry
1890s establishments in Ireland